A. nigra may refer to:

 Actia nigra, a tachinid fly species 
 Aculeola nigra, the hooktooth dogfish, a small, little known dogfish, the only member of the genus Aculeola
 Alpinia nigra, an herb in the ginger family
 Arkoola nigra, a fungus plant pathogen species
 Astrapia nigra, the Arfak Astrapia, a large black bird of paradise species

See also
 Nigra (disambiguation)